The House of Damas is one of France's oldest noble families, recorded since the 9th century and including lords of Vergy, counts of Vermandois and barons of Semur.

Notable members 
 Sybille of Bâgé, daughter of Guy I Damas de Baugé, Baron of Couzan, wife of Amadeus V, Count of Savoy
 Hugh of Cluny, abbot of Cluny Abbey and builder of the 'Cluny III' phase there.
 Étienne-Charles de Damas-Crux(1754-1846), he was a French soldier and politician.
 Joseph-François-Louis-Charles de Damas(1758-1829), he was a French general.
 François-Étienne de Damas(1764-1828), he was a French general.
 Roger de Damas (1765-1823), he was a French Army officer and Royalist general.
 Ange Hyacinthe Maxence, baron de Damas (1785–1862), he was a French Duke and a Minister.
 Gabrielle de Rochechouart de Mortemart married Claude Leonor de Damas Marquis de Thianges (House of Damas).

External links

sandrinenouvel.chez-alice.fr

 
History of Burgundy